Hee, also spelled Hui, is a single-syllable Korean feminine given name, as well as an element in many two-syllable Korean given names. The meaning differs based on the hanja used to write it.

Hanja
There are 24 hanja with this reading, and five variant forms, on the South Korean government's official list of hanja which may be registered for use in given names:

 (바랄 희 ): hope
 (기쁠 희 ): enjoy
 (드물 희 ): rare
 (놀이 희 ): game
 (variant)
 (여자 희 ): concubine
 (variant)
 (마를 희 ): dawn
 (기쁠 희 ): joy
 (나무 이름 희 ): a species of tree
 (복 희 ): congratulations
 (아름다울 희 ): amuse oneself
 (기뻐할 희 ): enjoy
 (빛날 희 ): glimmer
 (variant)
 (복희씨 희 ): vapour
 (불 희 ): fire
 (햇빛 희 ): sunlight
 (비슷할 희 ): resemble
 (기쁠 희 ): enjoy
 (희생 희 ): sacrifice
 (한숨 쉴 희 ): alas
 (빛날 희 ): glorious
 (variant)
 (variant)
 (불빛 희 ): beam of light
 (빛날 희 ): shine
 (감탄할 희 ): scream
 (기쁠 희 ): woman

Single-syllable given name
People with this name include:
Seo Hui (942–998), Goryeo Dynasty diplomat
Hwang Hui (1363–1452), official of the Goryeo and Joseon Dynasties
Hee Oh (born 1969), South Korean mathematician
Hyun Hee (born 1976), South Korean épée fencer
Geum Hee (born 1979), South Korean writer born in Jilin, China
Hee Seo (born 1986), South Korean ballerina with the American Ballet Theatre
Ju Hui (born 1989), South Korean team handball player

In two-syllable given names
In the mid-20th century, various names containing this element were popular for newborn Korean girls, including:
Jung-hee (4th place in 1950, 6th place in 1960)
Kyung-hee (9th place in 1950, 3rd place in 1960)
Soon-hee (8th place in 1940)
Young-hee (3rd place in 1950, 9th place in 1960)

Other names containing this element include:

First syllable
Hee-chul
Hee-jin
Hee-joon
Hee-jung
Hee-kyung
Hee-sun
Hee-sung

Second syllable
Byung-hee
Chun-hee
Do-hee
Eun-hee
Hyun-hee
Jae-hee
Jin-hee
Joon-hee
Man-hee
Mi-hee
Min-hee

 
Myung-hee
Kwang-hee
Seol-hee
Seung-hee
So-hee
Soo-hee
Sung-hee
Sun-hee
Tae-hee
Yeon-hee
Yoon-hee

See also
List of Korean given names

References

Korean given names